The 33rd Curtis Cup Match was played on 12 and 13 June 2004 at Formby Golf Club in Formby, Merseyside, England. The United States won 10 to 8. Great Britain and Ireland won 5 of the 6 foursomes but American dominated in the singles, winning 9 of the 12 matches. Michelle Wie became the youngest ever Curtis Cup player, at the age of 14.

Format
The contest was a two-day competition, with three foursomes and six singles matches on each day, a total of 18 points.

Each of the 18 matches was worth one point in the larger team competition. If a match was all square after the 18th hole extra holes were not played. Rather, each side earned  a point toward their team total. The team that accumulated at least 9 points won the competition. In the event of a tie, the current holder retained the Cup.

Teams
Eight players for Great Britain & Ireland and USA participated in the event plus one non-playing captain for each team.

Saturday's matches

Morning foursomes

Afternoon singles

Sunday's matches

Morning foursomes

Afternoon singles

References

External links
Official site
USGA archive
2004 Curtis Cup (about.sports)

Curtis Cup
Golf tournaments in England
International sports competitions hosted by England
Sport in Merseyside
Curtis Cup
Curtis Cup
Curtis Cup
Formby